Restless and Live, formally titled Restless and Live (Blind Rage – Live in Europe 2015), is a double live album and concert film by Accept and was released 13 January 2017. The concert was recorded at the Bang Your Head!!! 2015 festival in Balingen, Germany. The album was released in multiple formats, including a 2-CD digipack, a 4-LP release, and a DVD and Blu-Ray version of the concert film was released both separately and along with the 2-CD version of the album.

It is the first live album to feature lead singer Mark Tornillo who joined the band in 2009 and features songs from their entire catalog and also marks the debut of guitarist Uwe Lulis and drummer Christopher Williams .

Track listing

Charts

Credits 
 Mark Tornillo – lead vocals
 Wolf Hoffmann – guitar
 Uwe Lulis – guitar
 Peter Baltes – bass guitar
 Christopher Williams  – drums

References

External links 
 Accept website

2017 live albums
Accept (band) albums
Nuclear Blast albums